Alison Moore may refer to:

 Alison Moore (writer) (born 1971), English writer
 Alison Moore (politician), British politician